Isabella Thoburn (March 29, 1840 – Sept. 1, 1901) was an American Christian missionary of the Methodist Episcopal Church best known for her establishment of educational institutions and missionary work in North India, subsequent to the East India Company's relinquishment of power to the British government in India.

Biography
Isabella Thoburn was born in 1840 near St. Clairsville, Ohio. She attended local schools and the Wheeling Female Seminary in Wheeling, Virginia (now in West Virginia).

In 1866, after she had taught for several years, Isabella was invited by her brother James Mills Thoburn, a  Methodist Episcopal missionary in India, to assist him in his educational and missionary work in India. She delayed her departure until 1869 when the formation of the Women's Foreign Missionary Society of the Methodist Episcopal Church enabled her to undertake missionary work under denominational affiliation and auspices.

In India, Thoburn's work culminated in the founding of an important woman's college, Isabella Thoburn College in Lucknow (1870), as well as a Methodist High School in Kanpur. These two educational establishments were among the first in colonial India, catering to the educational and religious needs of an emergent Anglo Indian population in Awadh.

Thoburn returned to the United States for a period to study at Lucy Rider Meyer's Chicago Training School for City, Home, and Foreign Missions in Illinois. In 1887, Meyer appointed her as the first house mother and superintendent of the school's new Methodist Deaconess Home for training female deacons.

She died in 1901 in Lucknow, India.

See also
List of bishops of the United Methodist Church

References

Sources
Methodism:  Ohio Area (1812–1962), edited by John M. Versteeg, Litt.D., D.D. (Ohio Area Sesquicentennial Committee, 1962).

External links

 
 Isabella Thoburn College (website)
 Isabella Thoburn's biography at the Boston University School of Theology website
 

Methodists from Ohio
People from St. Clairsville, Ohio
1840 births
1901 deaths
Methodist missionaries in India
American expatriates in India
American biographers
Missionary educators
Founders of Indian schools and colleges
Female Christian missionaries
American women philanthropists
19th-century American people
19th-century American philanthropists
Woman's Foreign Missionary Society of the Methodist Episcopal Church
19th-century women philanthropists